Below is a list of defunct retailers of the United States.

Across the United States, a large number of local stores and store chains that started between the 1920s and 1950s have become defunct since the late 1960s, when many chains were either consolidated or liquidated. Some may have been lost due to mergers, while others were affected by a phenomenon of large store closings in the 2010s known as the retail apocalypse.

Automotive

 Al's Auto Supply Chain that operated in Washington, California, Idaho, Oregon, Nevada and Alaska; purchased by CSK Auto. Founded by Abe "Al" Wexler in Everett, Washington in the late 1950s; sold 15 store chain to Paccar in 1987; Paccar sold chain (along with Grand Auto) in 1999 to CSK Auto which eventually rebranded stores as Schucks.
 Auto Palace  A New England-based chain that had 112 stores in six states before it was acquired and rebranded by AutoZone in 1998
 Auto Works  Began in Michigan in 1976 by Perry Drug Stores and which grew mostly through acquisitions prior to being sold to Northern Automotive in 1988. In turn, Northern became CSK and CSK sold Auto Works to Hahn Automotive in 1993 before Hahn finally closed Auto Works in 1997.  At its height, there were 252 stores in eight states.
 Chief Auto Parts acquired and rebranded by AutoZone in 1998
 CSK Auto (CSK = Checker, Schucks, Kragen) based in Phoenix, Arizona with stores nationwide; bought by O'Reilly Auto Parts in 2008
Parts America Sears created the Parts America store concept in 1995 and tried to convert full service Western Auto stores into the parts only Parts America brand until it sold the stores to Advance Auto Parts in 1998.  Upon merger, Parts America stores were rebranded Advance Auto Parts and the website partsamerica.com became a web only store for Advance Auto Parts. With financial backing from Sears, Advance Auto Parts decided to make the partsamerica.com into a portal for web purchasing of auto parts as part of a joint venture with CSK Auto. The website appeared to have been deactivated by 2009.
 Super Shops filed for bankruptcy in 1998
 Trak Auto Mid-Atlantic, Midwest, and West Coast; founded by Robert Haft (Crown Books) in 1981; purchased and rebranded by Advance Auto Parts in 2002
 Western Auto nationwide, once had 1,800 locations, purchased by Sears in 1987 and sold to and rebranded by Advance Auto Parts in 1998

Camping, sports or athletic stores 

 Davega Stores  bankrupt in 1963
 Galyan's Trading Post acquired by Dick's Sporting Goods in 2004
 Gander Mountain  rebranded as Gander Outdoors in 2019 following bankruptcy and reorganization
 G.I. Joe's Oregon and Washington; rebranded as Joe's in 2007, went bankrupt and closed in 2009; seven locations taken over by Dick's Sporting Goods
 Golfsmith went bankrupt in 2016 and acquired by Dick's Sporting Goods; 36-38 locations rebranded as Golf Galaxy
 Herman's World of Sporting Goods went bankrupt in 1993 and closed in 1996
 Just for Feet bankrupt in 1999, acquired by Footstar, final stores closed in 2004
 Koenig Sporting Goods filed for bankruptcy in 1997, 27 of 40 stores sold to Woolworth
 MC Sports filed for bankruptcy and closed in 2017
 Modell's Sporting Goods first store opened in 1889. On March 11, 2020, the company filed for bankruptcy, and announced it would close all 115 stores. At the time of the announcement, Modell's was the world’s oldest sporting goods chain
 Olympia Sports the company was founded in 1975, and on July 22, 2022, the company filed for bankruptcy and announced it would close all 35 stores by September 30th
 Oshman's Sporting Goods founded in Houston in 1933; acquired by Gart Sports in 2001; most stores rebranded as Sports Authority
 Sportmart merged with Gart Sports in 1998 and closed in 2000
 Sports Authority bankrupt in 2016 and liquidated. Brand was acquired by Dick's Sporting Goods
 Sports Unlimited First store in 1983. In 2008 closed all stores and moved online.
 Sport Chalet went bankrupt and closed in 2016
 Sportswest owned by Pay 'n Save and spun off in 1984; acquired by Big 5 Sporting Goods in 1988
 Sunny's Surplus went bankrupt in 2000 but emerged in 2001; filed for bankruptcy again in 2007 and closed most locations; three reopened in late 2007 but shut down again in 2008

Catalog showrooms 

 Best Productsfiled for bankruptcy for the second time in September 1996 and closed all of its stores by the following February
 Brendle's became bankrupt and liquidated in 1996
 Consumers Distributing  sought bankruptcy protection in 1996
 Ellman's acquired by Service Merchandise in 1985
 H. J. Wilson Co. Southern states, based in Baton Rouge, Louisiana; acquired by Service Merchandise in 1986
 K's Merchandise Mart – liquidated in 2006
 Luria's - originally L. Luria & Son,  was a chain of catalog showroom stores in Florida, from 1961 to 1997.
 Service Merchandise closed all its retail stores by early 2002; the name was resurrected in 2004 for an online retail operation
 Witmark operated in southwestern Michigan; founded 1969, liquidated 1997

Clothing, shoe and specialty stores 

 Abby Z. plus size design label founded by Abby Zeichner in 2004. The Abby Z flagship store opened in SoHo, New York at 57 Greene Street in 2008 and closed in 2009 when its parent company filed for bankruptcy.
 Anchor Blue – youth-oriented mall chain, founded in 1972 as Miller's Outpost. The brand had 150 stores at its peak, predominantly on the West Coast. Anchor Blue declared bankruptcy in 2009 and shuttered more than 50 stores, and gradually shrank to include stores solely in California. It went bankrupt once more in 2011, with the remaining stores closed before Easter of that year.
 Anderson-Little – men's specialty retailer originally associated with a large Massachusetts-based men's clothing manufacturer; also known as Anderson Little-Richman Brothers; owned for many years by F. W. Woolworth Company. Ceased operations in 1998, revived as a small online retailer in 2008.
 Braus Stores liquidated in 1932
 Casual Corner liquidated in 2005
 Chess King – sold to Merry-Go-Round in 1993; liquidated along with that chain in 1995
 Christopher & Banks – bankrupted in 2021 from financial loss, because of the COVID-19 pandemic
 County Seat – founded in 1973, the denim-focused mall retailer expanded in the 1980s to nearly 500 stores. It filed for bankruptcy in 1996 and shuttered stores, and another bankruptcy in 1999 put the company out of business.
 Cygnet Shops women's fashion store that closed in 1975
 DEB closed its stores in 2015, and returned later that year as an online-only retailer selling plus-size clothing
 Delia's – founded in 1993 as a juniors' clothing catalog, Delia's (stylized as dELiA*s) expanded to more than 100 physical locations before cheaper competitors sent it to bankruptcy in 2014. It was reopened in 2015 as an online retailer, but this was unsuccessful and has been licensed by online fashion company Dolls Kill since 2018.
 Disney Store – owned and operated by The Walt Disney Company. Closed the majority of its retail stores in 2021 mainly due to the COVID-19 pandemic, with merchandise moved online and to department stores such as Target and JCPenney.
 Edison Brothers Stores – operator of numerous shoe and clothing chains, including Bakers Shoes, Wild Pair, J. Riggings, Oaktree, Foxmoor and Fashion Conspiracy. Company was liquidated in 1999, though some chains it operated, including Bakers, have survived.
 Fashion Bug – plus-size women's clothing retailer that once spanned more than 1000 stores. Parent company Charming Shoppes, which owned other plus-size retailers including Lane Bryant, shuttered the brand in early 2013.
 Florsheim – mall shoe store; still sells online
 Gadzooks – Founded in 1983 as a T-shirt store, Gadzooks grew to a 250-store mall fashion retailer before making an ill-advised decision to discontinue menswear. The company was purchased by competitor Forever 21 out of bankruptcy in 2005, with its stores either closed or converted to F21 formats.
 Gantos - a women's specialty clothing retailer based in Grand Rapids, Michigan. In late 1993, the company announced bankruptcy reorganization, closing 50 stores between 1993 and 1994, and the chain announced the liquidation of its remaining 114 stores by the end of the decade, ceasing operations in 2000.
 Goodlyne Dress Company was a Manhattan clothing business which was incorporated in August 1931. In January 1934 the firm leased floors in an establishment at 152 - 156 West 25th Street. The corporation was headed by Herman Kleinmetz. 
 Gottschalks – Founded in 1904, this middle-market regional department store was once the largest independently owned, publicly traded department store in the United States. Bankruptcy claimed the brand in 2009.
 Hahn's Shoes (1876–1995) Washington, D.C. region
 Harold's founded in 1948 in Norman, Oklahoma, and liquidated through bankruptcy in 2008
 Hess Shoe Store (1872–1999)  Baltimore, Maryland region.
 J. Brannam a unit of the F. W. Woolworth Company established in 1979 that operated primarily in the southern U.S.; closed in 1985
 J. Byrons Florida-based retailer, sold to Uptons, closed in 1996
 Jay Jacobs Seattle-based clothier; founded in 1941 and closed in 1999
 Kids "R" Us – a division of Toys "R" Us, created in 1983 to sell children's and preteen clothing; folded in 2003
 Kinney Shoes manufacturer and retailer established in 1894 and purchased by F.W. Woolworth in 1963
 Kleinhans a men's clothier in Buffalo, New York that operated from 1893 until 1992
 Klopfenstein's a men's clothier in the Seattle-Tacoma area founded in 1918 and in operation until 1992
 The Limited filed for bankruptcy and liquidated in 2017. Its products became available again online after the brand was acquired by Sycamore Properties.
 Margo's LaMode Dallas-based women's clothing store that closed in 1996 after corporate parent underwent bankruptcy reorganization
 Martin + Osa – Established in 2006 as the more mature counterpart to American Eagle Outfitters, the chain grew to 28 stores before millions in losses forced its parent company to discontinue it. The brand's stores and e-commerce site disappeared in 2010. 
 Merry-Go-Round – Merry-Go-Round had more than 500 locations during its heyday in the 1980s. It went bankrupt in 1995.
 Mervyn's – a California-based regional department store founded in 1949. Mervyn's ill-fated expansion out of West Coast markets in the months before a recession sent the company into bankruptcy in 2008.
 Miller's Outpost see "Anchor Blue" above
 Payless (footwear retailer) - Filed for bankruptcy twice and closed all stores in Canada and the US in 2019.
 Raleigh's also known as Raleigh Haberdasher; a men's and women's clothing store in Washington, D.C., 1911–1992
 Robert Hall clothing store that existed from 1938 to 1977.  At its peak, the store had locations in both New York City and Los Angeles. In addition, the firm invented the big box concept where all non-clothing lines were leased by other retailers.
 Rogers Peet New York City based men's clothing retailer established in late 1874.  Among the chain's innovations: Rogers Peet showed actual merchandise in their advertising, advertised fabric types on merchandise, and put price tags on merchandise.  The chain went belly-up in 1981.
 Roos/Atkins – a San Francisco menswear retailer formed in 1957 and expanded throughout the Bay Area in the 60s. The brand went into decline in the 1980s and ceased operations by 1995.
 Ruehl No.925 concept brand launched by Abercrombie & Fitch in 2004; poor sales and operating losses led to A&F ceasing operations of Ruehl in early 2010
 The Sample Western New York based retailer founded in Buffalo in 1928 when its founder brought a sample set of 48 dresses back from New York City.  At its peak, the retailer was noted for its semi-annual clearance known as the Pup Sale.  The demise of The Sample was in 1991 following the death of the chain's chairman a year earlier.
 Sibley's Shoes a show retailer founded by Harry Rosenfield in 1920; had locations in Michigan and Ohio and closed in 2003 when the company's executives decided to not save the company
 Steve & Barry's "extreme value" retail clothing chain that operated 276 stores in 39 states.
 Sycamore Shops an Indianapolis-based women's clothing retailer; spun off from L.S. Ayres; was later forced into bankruptcy and liquidated by early 1996
 Thom McAn shoe retailer founded in 1922; had over 1,400 stores at its peak in the 1960s. In 1996, the parent company decided to close all remaining stores, but Thom McAn footwear is available in Kmart stores.
 Today's Man – a men's suiting store that began in the 1970s and expanded rapidly in the 1980s and 90s. Overexpansion brought the brand to bankruptcy in 1996.
 Virginia Dare Dresses, Incorporated merged with Atlantic Thrift Centers, Inc in 1963
 Warner Brothers Studio Store – Meant to be the WB answer to the rapidly growing Disney Store, the Warner Bros. Studio Stores sold collectibles and apparel based around WB properties including Looney Tunes and DC Comics. The Studio Stores were a victim of the AOL-Time Warner merger, and shuttered operations in 2001.
 Yellow Front Stores – Founded in the 1950s as an army surplus store, Yellow Front transitioned to become a camping gear retailer before going bankrupt in 1990.

Department and discount stores

Drug stores

A–M

 A. L. Price Metro Detroit; part of Perry Drug Stores
 Adams Drug Company
 Arbor Drugs Michigan-based chain; acquired by CVS Pharmacy
 Big "B" Drugs
 Brooks Pharmacy chain of more than 330 pharmacies located throughout New England and New York with corporate headquarters were located in Warwick, Rhode Island; was acquired by Rite Aid in 2007
 Cunningham Drug Stores Metro Detroit, Michigan area; founded 1889, dissolved in 1982
 Dart Drug converted to Fantle's
 Dorb the Chemist, Inc. filed for bankruptcy in 1932
 Drug Emporium
 Drug Fair - Alexandria Virginia based drug chain.
 Eckerd Corporation acquired by CVS Pharmacy in the South and Rite Aid in the Northeast–Mid atlantic Region
 F&M Super Drug Store
 Fantle's
 Farmacias El Amal San Juan, Puerto Rico, firm; 20 locations bought by Walgreens in 2008; remaining closed in 2011
 Fay's Drug
 G. O. Guy acquired by Thrifty PayLess
 Genovese Drug Stores
 Gray Drug purchased by Rite Aid
 Haag Drug Company
 Happy Harry's acquired by Walgreens
 Hook's Drug Stores acquired by Revco
 K&B (also known as Katz & Bestoff) a New Orleans, Louisiana-based pharmacy and general merchandise store chain
 Kinsley & Darling Druggists
 LaVerdiere's Super Drug Stores a Maine-based pharmacy acquired by Rite Aid in 1994

N–Z

 Osco Drug & Sav-on Drugs freestanding locations acquired by CVS Pharmacy; Osco still exists as the pharmacy within Jewel 
 Pay 'n Save
 Peoples Drug acquired by CVS Pharmacy
 Perry Drug Stores acquired by Rite Aid in 1995
 Phar-Mor bankrupt due to $500 million embezzlement; some assets acquired by Giant Eagle
 Read's Drug Store
 Reliable Drug Stores
 Revco Most locations acquired by CVS Pharmacy and Some Locations In Virginia and Binghamton Were Acquired by Eckerd Corporation
 Rexall
 Rock Bottom Stores became part of Duane Reade
 Rx Place Woolworth
 Sav-on
 Schwab's Pharmacy Hollywood, California, hangout for movie actors; closed in 1983
 Skaggs Drug Centers became part of Albertsons, Inc.
 Snyder Drug Stores acquired by Walgreens in 2010
 Standard Drug Company was part of Melville Corporation
 SupeRx Kroger created the first SupeRx store in 1961 with most stores next door or very close to existing Kroger stores
 Tam's Gold Seal Drugs Central Indiana-based chain
 Thrift Drug merged into Eckerd after J.C. Penney bought Eckerd
 Thrifty PayLess acquired by Rite Aid in 1996
 Treasury Drug acquired by J.C. Penney, then shuttered in 1980
 Value Giant
 Wellby Super Drug

Electronics stores 

 47th Street Photo
 Allied Radio Chicago, Illinois, acquired by Radio Shack in 1970; some stores sold to Schaak Electronics in 1973, a few stores converted to Radio Shack, and the rest closed
 Bernie's
 Bryn Mawr Stereo
 Circuit City filed for bankruptcy in 2008 and liquidated on March 8, 2009; reopened online through Tiger Direct in April 2009; closed again in late December 2012; intellectual property was sold again to Circuit City Corp. in January 2016, which plans to open an online operation and retail stores
 CompuAdd bankrupted in 1993
 CompUSA  on November 2, 2012, it was announced that Systemax would drop both the CompUSA and Circuit City storefront brands; CompUSA was relaunched in 2018 as an online retailer.
 Computer City CompUSA quickly closed this chain after purchasing it from Tandy in 1998
 Crazy Eddie liquidated in 1989
 Davega Stores bankrupt in 1963
 Douglas TV
 DOW Stereo/Video
 Erol's
 Federated Group
 Fretter
 Fry's Electronics Closed permanently after 35 years as a result of low sales due to online competition and the COVID-19 pandemic
 FutureShop Closed in the US 1999.  Bought out by Best Buy 2001. March 28, 2015, Best Buy announced the dissolution of the Future Shop brand and the closure of 66 of its locations.
 Gateway Country operated by Gateway from 1996 to 2004
 Good Guys purchased by CompUSA in 2003
 Heathkit
 H. H. Gregg, Inc. Went bankrupt and closed in 2017; relaunched as an online retailer in 2017 and opened its first brick and mortar store in 2019 following bankruptcy. 
 HiFi Buys
 Highland Superstores liquidated in 1993
 Incredible Universe  closed in 1997; six stores acquired by Fry's Electronics and the rest shut down
 J&R major New York City electronics and music store officially closed in April 2014
 Lafayette Radio
 Lechmere
 Luskin's Baltimore, Maryland-based appliance and electronics retailer
 Mars Music  Founded in 1996, over-expansion, a struggle to raise financial capital and a failed reorganization attempt led to Chapter 7 bankruptcy in 2002.
 Newmark and Lewis
 Olson Electronics (currently a redirect that needs expansion) a nationwide electronics store chain founded in 1927 by brothers Sidney, Philip and Irving Olsen in Akron, Ohio; at one time had more retail locations than Radio Shack; sold to Teledyne in 1968 and rebranded Teledyne Olson Electronics; later sold to 3 Chicago investors in August 1984 who later filed for bankruptcy just 15 months later; filed for bankruptcy in 1985
 Polk Brothers
 RCA
 Schaak Electronics liquidated in 1986 after filing for bankruptcy the second time in a decade
 Sharper Image filed for bankruptcy in 2008 only to relaunch in 2009.
 Silo
 Soft Warehouse founded in 1984 and changed name to CompUSA in 1991
 Sound Advice
 Steinberg's
 Sun Television and Appliances bankrupt and liquidated in 1998
 Video Concepts
 Tech HiFi
 TigerDirect In 2015, TigerDirect phased out brick-and-mortar retail operations. Online operations continue. 
 Tweeter Went bankrupt in 2008; original company remains as a shell company.
 Ultimate Electronics
 United Audio Centers
 The Warehouse
 The Wiz

Five-and-dime; variety stores 

 Ben Franklin (company)
 Caldor
 Danners 5 & 10
 E. J. Korvette
 F. W. Woolworth Company successor corporation is Foot Locker Inc.
 Fred's
 G. C. Murphy
 GEM 
 Gemco
 H. L. Green
 Hills
 Hudson Brothers'
 J.G. McCrory
 Modell's Shopper's World
 J.J. Newberry
 Jamesway
 King's Department Stores
 Kuhn's Big K acquired by Walmart in 1981
 MacFrugals merged into Big Lots!
 McLellan's
 Neisner's
 Otasco Arkansas, Kansas, Oklahoma and Texas
 Richman Gordman business model was overhauled and name shortened to Gordmans in the late 1990s
 Rodgers Oregon
 S. Klein
 S. H. Kress
 S. S. Kresge sold all original S.S. Kresge stores, renamed Kmart in 1977
 Shopper's City
 Sky City
 Sprouse-Reitz
 TG&Y
 Times Square Stores
 Two Guys
 W.T. Grant  went bankrupt in 1976; more a small scale department store than a 5 and 10 variety store
 Woolco  big box store version of Woolworth – owned by F.W. Woolworth
 Zody's

Furniture stores 

Art Van Furniture Founded in 1959 in Warren, MI, and operated over 300 stores and outlets in 7 states. On March 5, 2020, Art Van Furniture announced it would liquidate all of their company owned stores and file for chapter 11 bankruptcy.
 Barker Bros.  Los Angeles-based furniture store chain which was at one time the largest furniture store chain on the west coast for nearly a century before it filed for bankruptcy in 1992
 Bombay Company U.S. stores
 Castro Convertibles primarily Northeast and Southeast U.S.
 Fradkin Brothers Furniture Baltimore County, Maryland
 Georg Jensen Inc. (New York, NY) (1935-1968)
 Harden Furniture  was in business for 175 years before ceasing operations
 Heilig-Meyers
 Levitz Furniture  was in business for nearly 100 years before liquidating in bankruptcy in early 2008
 Linens 'n Things
 Love's Furniture  filed for chapter 11 bankruptcy on January 7, 2021, as a result of the COVID-19 pandemic. Love's Furniture also bought the former Art Van Furniture when it went under, but is, after only 6 months, closing all but 1 store
 Mattress Barn  Florida
 Rhodes Furniture
 The Room Store
 Seaman's Furniture merged into Levitz Furniture in 2005
 Sleepy'smerged into Mattress Firm in 2016
 Wickes Furniture went bankrupt February 3, 2008

Grocery stores and supermarkets

A–M

 365 by Whole Foods Market convert to regular Whole Foods stores in 2019 after Amazon acquired Whole Foods
 A&P also known as The Great Atlantic & Pacific Tea Company; filed for bankruptcy for the second time in July 2015 and closed its last store in November 2015
 ABC Markets
 ABCO Foods- former Arizona division of Alpha Beta spun off in 1984; stores closed by 2003
 AJ Bayless- Arizona; stores sold to Bashas’ in 1993
 Alpha Beta converted to Ralphs or Food 4 Less in 1994
 Big Bear Stores Columbus, Ohio based chain; stores closed or sold to Kroger by 2004. Unrelated chain in San Diego with same name sold to Fleming Companies and Albertsons in 1994
 BI-LO - dissolved in 2021
 Bohack
 Bottom Dollar Food  acquired by Aldi 2015
 Boys Markets converted to Ralphs or Food 4 Less in 1994
 Bruno's 
 Buehler Foods operated as Buehler's Buy-Low
 Buttrey Food & Drug Montana, Wyoming, North Dakota; sold to Albertsons in 1998
 Cala Foods and Bell Markets rebranded as DeLano's IGA; others sold to other retailers
 Carter's Foods
 Chatham Supermarkets chain headquartered in Southeastern Michigan founded by Royal Supermarkets in the mid-1950s, bankrupt in  1987, acquired by Kroger after defunct
 Clemens Markets suburban Philadelphia, Pennsylvania; acquired by Giant in 2006
 Colonial Stores
 Big Star Markets
 Dahl's Foods Des Moines, Iowa-based chain; acquired by Associated Wholesale Grocers after bankruptcy and rebranded as Price Chopper and Cash Saver in 2015
 Delchamps
 Dick's Supermarket Southwestern Wisconsin; acquired by Piggly Wiggly in 2006
 Dominick's Chicagoland; operated by Safeway from 1998 until the last closures in January 2014; some locations acquired by Jewel, Whole Foods Market, Mariano's Fresh Market, and Heinen's Fine Foods
 Eagle Food Centers- Midwest chain; ceased operations by 2003
 Earth Fare as of 2021, 19 stores reopened
 Eisner Food Stores downstate Illinois chain acquired by Jewel Food Stores, stores converted to the Jewel name by 1985
 Family MartFlorida-based Family Mart division of A&P was closed in 1999
 Farm Fresh (Maryland)  chain of 18 stores in Baltimore, MD operated by Jack Millman; most stores sold to Richfood; not related to existing Virginia-based Farm Fresh Food & Pharmacy
 Farmer Jack Metro Detroit; acquired by A&P in 1989, closed July 7, 2007, then liquidated
 Fazio's originally was Fisher Foods; in California, first known as Fazio's Shopping Bag and then just Fazio's
 Finast (also known as First National Stores) purchased by Ahold; rebranded Edwards
 Fisher Foods was named Fazio's after a merger in 1965
 Food Fair later Pantry Pride
 Fresh & Easy California, Nevada, Arizona; American subsidiary of British retailer Tesco
 Furrs Supermarkets New Mexico/West Texas; went bankrupt in 2001. Furr's cafeteria division still in business
 Genuardi's  defunct as of 2012 as a chain; 2015 all locations
 Giant Ralphs big box format; Southern California
 Giant Open Air merged with Farm Fresh Food & Pharmacy
 Grand Union New Jersey- and New York-area chain; bankrupt; bought and became Grand Union Family Markets in Upstate New York and Vermont; purchased by Tops Friendly Markets in 2012, converting them to the Tops banner in 2013
 Haggen west coast regional chain, acquired by Albertsons
 Hills Supermarkets
 Hinky Dinky Nebraska chain acquired by Nash Finch in 2000
 Hughes Marketsa Southern California-based supermarket chain that was first acquired by QFC in 1996 and then merger into Ralphs the following year when the parent companies of both Hughes and Ralphs were simultaneously acquired by Fred Meyer
 Jewel T founded by the Jewel Companies as their discount chain, but was sold to Save-A-Lot in 1984 when Jewel was acquired by American Stores
 Jitney Jungle
 Kash n' Karry became Sweetbay Supermarket
 Kessel Food Market — Michigan chain sold to Kroger
 Kohl's Food Stores Wisconsin chain acquired by A&P and closed by 2003
 Laneco Eastern Pennsylvania/Western New Jersey; closed in 2001
 Loblaws Northeastern Ohio, Northwestern Pennsylvania and Western New York. Stores in California sold in 1976. 
 Market Basket (California) Former Kroger associated chain that operated in Southern California from 1930 to 1982. Not related to similar named chains in Texas, Louisiana, or New England.
 Mars (supermarket)Maryland grocery chain which operated from 1943 to 2016.
 Marsh Supermarkets Indiana and Ohio chain that was liquidated in 2017

N–Z

 National Tea
 O'Malia's Food Markets Central Indiana chain that was liquidated in 2017
 Omni Superstore Dominick's big-box format
 Pantry Pride
 Pathmark
 Pay'n Takit acquired by Safeway
 Penn Dutch - south Florida chain that shut liquidated in 2019
 Penn Fruit
 Pick-N-Pay Supermarkets — Cleveland area chain acquired by Finast
 Purity Supreme Boston area
 QFI
 Quality Markets owned by Penn Traffic, Western New York; acquired by Tops Friendly Markets
 Rainbow Foods Twin Cities chain owned by Fleming Companies, then Roundy's. Roundy's exited Minnesota in 2014. 
 Red Food Chattanooga, Tennessee, area; acquired by Bi-Lo Stores
 Red Owl Upper Midwest;  acquired by Supervalu in 1988
 Sage's Sage's Complete Markets based in San Bernardino, California, chain that was liquidated in 1973.
 Sav-A-Center A&P in the New Orleans, Louisiana, region
 Schwegmann Brothers Giant Supermarkets New Orleans, Louisiana; acquired by National Tea
 Seaway Food Town Northwest Ohio chain sold to Spartan Stores in 2000; remaining stores closed or sold by 2003
 Seessel's Supermarkets acquired by Schnucks
 Shopping Bag Food Stores a Southern California chain that was founded in 1930 and later acquired by Vons and then Fazio's before it was rebranded and later sold to Albertsons in 1978
 Skaggs-Alpha Beta
 Sunflower Market SuperValu-owned natural foods market; closed in 2008; never affiliated with the southwestern US chain of the same name
 Super Duper
 Super Fresh
 Super Saver Foods
 Twin Valu – hypermarket launched by SuperValu (owner of Cub Foods and ShopKo) in Cuyahoga Falls, Ohio in 1989 and Euclid, Ohio (1990); closed March 1995
 Ukrop's  Richmond, Virginia chain acquired by Ahold and converted to Martin's in 2010; notable for pioneering ready-to-eat foods in the 1980s
 Victory Supermarkets Greater Boston chain sold to Hannaford
 Waldbaum's  New York metropolitan area (liquidated in 2015)
 Weingarten's  Houston area, Arkansas, Louisiana; sold to Safeway in 1983
 White Hen Pantry merged with 7-Eleven in mid-2007
 Wild Oats Markets

Home decor and craft stores 

 Bombay Company
 Frank's Nursery & Crafts
 Hancock Fabrics bankrupt 2016; intellectual property acquired by Michaels
 Leewards
 Old America bankrupt 1999 and liquidated remaining stores
 Pier 1 Imports permanently closed all 540 of its stores in 2020
 Rag Shop permanently closed in 2007
 Waccamaw's Homeplace/Waccamaw Pottery
 Wicks 'N' Sticks

Home improvement 

Builder's Emporium
 Builder's Square subsidiary of Kmart; sold to Hechinger
 Channel Home Centers
 Contractor Supply
 Eagle Hardware & Garden bought by Lowe's in 1999
 Ernst Home Centers Seattle, Washington
 EXPO Design Center
 Forest City became Handy Andy
 Furrow Building Materials
 Gamble-Skogmo bought by Our Own Hardware in 1986
 Handy Andy Home Improvement Center
 Handy Dan
 Hechinger
 Home Quarters Warehouse (HQ)
 HomeBase
 Hugh M. Woods Building Materials
 Knox Lumber
 Lechters Housewares  a kitchenware and home decor store
 Lumberjack Building Materials
 Orchard Supply Hardware closed by Lowe's in 2018
 Orscheln Farm & Home – sold to Tractor Supply Company and Bomgaars in 2022
 Pay 'N Pak
 Payless Cashways included Furrows & Payless; all assets liquidated as of November 2001
 Pergament Home Centers
 Rickel
 Scotty's Builders Supply
 Somerville Lumber
 Yardbirds Home Center

Music, booksellers, and video stores (records, tapes, books, CDs, DVDs, etc.)

A–M

 B. Dalton closed in 2010
 Blockbuster Music sold to Wherehouse Music in 1998; some locations converted to Wherehouse Music; majority were closed
 Blockbuster Video sold to Dish Network in 2011; all company-owned stores were closed January 12, 2014, but 1 franchise store remains open in Bend, Oregon.
 Bookstop
 Borders Books filed for bankruptcy in 2011; some locations purchased by Books-A-Million; borders.com website acquired by Barnes & Noble Booksellers
 Camelot Music converted to FYE stores
 CD World converted to FYE
 Coconuts Music converted to FYE
 Crown Books founded by Robert Haft in 1977; liquidated in 2001 after second bankruptcy
 Disc Jockey converted to FYE
 Encore Books permanently closed in 1999
 Family Christian Stores filed for bankruptcy in April 2015, forced to liquidate all stores in 2017
 Harmony House Michigan
 Hastings Entertainment  filed for bankruptcy in June 2016. Remaining stores closed October 31, 2016
 Hollywood Video  ceased operations in May 2010
 Incredible Universe  Several stores bought by Frys
 J&R New York City; closed their music store at the beginning of 2014
 Kim's Video and Music
 King Karol New York City
 Kroch's and Brentano's Chicago-based bookstore chain; filed for bankruptcy in 1995
 Licorice Pizza Southern California chain that was started in Long Beach by James Greenwood in 1969, acquired by Record Bar in 1985, acquired by Musicland in 1986, and rebranded Sam Goody. In November 2021, director Paul Thomas Anderson released a movie with the same name loosely based on this chain.
 Media Play closed and dissolved in 2006; a media superstore (books, music, and video) concept created by Musicland in 1992
 Movie Gallery operated stores under the Hollywood Video, Movie Gallery, and Game Crazy brands; liquidated and closed in 2010
 MovieStop (purchased by Hastings Entertainment shortly before bankruptcy)
 Music Plus Southern California-based chain that was acquired by Blockbuster and converted
 Musicland founded in Minneapolis in 1955, acquired by American Can in 1977; Musicland Group acquired Sam Goody in 1978 while keeping brand separate until 1997 when the Musicland Group decided to rebrand all existing Musicland stores as Sam Goody; Musicland Group acquired by Best Buy in 2001 and eventually sold to Trans World Entertainment

N–Z

 National Record Mart a Pittsburgh, Pennsylvania-based company that went bankrupt in 2002
 Planet Music converted to FYE
 Record Bar malls; acquired by Blockbuster in 1993 and converted
 Record Town store name changed to FYE by parent company Trans World Entertainment
 Record World company also operated The Record Shops at TSS; was purchased by W.H. Smith after declaring bankruptcy in 1992; rebranded The Wall the following year
 Sam Goody most locations converted to FYE, but two locations continue to operate as Sam Goody
 Saturday Matinee converted to FYE
 Sound Warehouse Dallas, Texas based chain; acquired by Blockbuster in 1992 and all stores converted to Blockbuster Music.
 Spec's Music Florida-based chain; last store closed in 2013
 Strawberries Music converted to FYE
 Streetside Records converted to FYE 
 Suncoast Motion Picture Company converted to FYE, though three continue to operate as Suncoast Motion Picture Company.
 Tape World a store concept created by Trans World Entertainment in 1979 but later replaced by its f.y.e. store concept
 Tower Records founded in 1960 in Sacramento, California; all retail stores were liquidated in 2006 and the name was purchased for use as an online-only retailer
 Turtle's Records & Tapes Atlanta, Georgia based chain with most stores located in Georgia and Florida; acquired by Blockbuster in 1993 and converted
 Virgin Megastores all Megastores in the United States were closed in 2009 and the remaining airport stores closed a few years later
 Waldenbooks  in 2011 the chain was liquidated after parent Borders filed for bankruptcy in 2011
 Wallichs Music City the largest music retailer on the West Coast during the 1950s and 1960s; founded by Glenn Wallich, founder of Capitol Records; had stores in California and briefly in Arizona before it went bankrupt in 1977
 West Coast Video permanently closed in 2009
 Wherehouse Music filed for bankruptcy in 2003; Trans World took control of 111 stores and liquidated nearly a third of them

Jewelers 
 Bailey Banks & Biddle (1832-2020)
 Crescent/Friedman's Jewelers
 J. E. Caldwell & Co. (1839-2009)
 Georg Jensen Inc. (New York, NY) (Fifth Ave., Manhattan)(1935-1968)

Office-supply stores 
 J. K. Gill Company Pacific Northwest; stationery, office supplies, books; all stores closed by 1999
 Office Warehouse a Virginia-based office supply chain that was acquired and absorbed by OfficeMax in 1992

Pet stores 
 Petland Discounts permanently closed in 2019.

Toy stores 

 All Wound Up acquired by Borders in 1999 and closed in 2001
 Child World (also known as Children's Palace) liquidated in 1992
 Circus Worldacquired by Melville in 1990 and converted to KB Toys
 Disney Store  The Disney Store closed by the end of January 19, 2022 as the retail moves to Target stores. 
 F.A.O. Schwarz sold to Toys 'R Us after bankruptcy in 2009; all stores closed except original NYC flagship store, which closed in 2015. The chain was bought out by ThreeSixty group and opened two new locations in Rockefeller Center, and LaGuardia airport, with plans to open up to 30 more in the future. 
 KB Toys liquidated February 9, 2009, which closed all of the remaining stores; sold to Toys "R" Us and then to Strategic Marks, LLC; although it planned to reopen stores in 2019, this never happened due to a lack of funding.
 Lionel Kid       City founded in 1957 by Leonard Wasserman; liquidated in 1993
 Lionel Playworld liquidated in 1993
 Noodle Kidoodle acquired in 2000 by Zany Brainy and rebranded
 Toys “R” Us liquidated most stores in 2018; still active in Canada and other countries. The company was bought and reformed by its lenders as a brand owned by TRU Kids. On November 27, 2019, Toys “R” Us re-entered the American market with a retail store at Westfield Garden State Plaza in Paramus, New Jersey. On December 7, 2019, a second location was opened at The Galleria in Houston, Texas. Both stores were permanently closed in early 2021. A new stand alone location was later opened in the American Dream Mall in New Jersey. On August 19, 2021, Macy’s bought Toys “R” Us and announced they will be opening store-within-a-store locations in 400 Macy’s locations.
 Warner Bros. Studio Store stores closed in 2001
 Zany Brainy liquidated in 2003 after parent company filed for bankruptcy

Video games and personal computing software 

 Babbage's
 Egghead Software
 FuncoLand
 GameCrazy
 Rhino Video Games
 Software Etc.

Warehouse clubs and membership department stores 

 E.J. Korvette gradually liquidated by 1981 after declaring bankruptcy
 Fedco
 GEM initially called Government Employees Mutual Stores, and later Government Employees Mart before settling on G. E. M. Membership Department Stores, a profit-making company that was aimed at the governmental employees market; first store was opened in Denver in 1956; after several expansions, the company filed for bankruptcy in 1974
 Gemco acquired by Lucky Stores in 1961; closed in 1986 and stores sold to Target; known as Memco in the Chicago and Washington, D.C. metropolitan areas
 Pace Membership Warehouse founded in Denver in 1983 and quickly expanded to the East Coast; acquired by Kmart in 1989; later sold to Sam's Club in 1993 and rebranded
 Price Club merged with Costco in 1993 and rebranded

See also 

 Lists of companies
 List of defunct fast-food restaurant chains
 List of defunct restaurants of the United States

References 

 
Retailers
Defunct